Six Shootin' Sheriff is a 1938 American Western film directed and written by Harry L. Fraser, and starring Ken Maynard and Marjorie Reynolds.

Plot
Jim "Trigger" Norton seeks revenge for those who wrongfully accused him and locked away for a crime he didn't commit.

Cast
Ken Maynard – Jim 'Trigger' Morton
Marjorie Reynolds – Molly Morgan
Lafe McKee – Zeke
Walter Long – Gang Leader Chuck
Bob Terry – Ed Morton
Harry Harvey – Todd
Tom London – Bar X Foreman
Richard Alexander – Bar X Rider Big Boy 
Warner Richmond – Ace Kendal
Ben Corbett – Henchman Red
Earl Dwire – Wild Bill Holman
Roger Williams – Henchman Bart

References

1938 films
1938 Western (genre) films
American Western (genre) films
Films directed by Harry L. Fraser
American black-and-white films
Films with screenplays by Harry L. Fraser
1930s American films